Antonio Maria Bettencourt Rodrigues (São Nicolau, Portuguese Cape Verde, March 5, 1854 – Monte Estoril (Cascais), 1933) was a doctor, Portuguese diplomat and politician.

Family 
He was the youngest son of José Júlio Rodrigues (Salvador do Mundo, Bardez, Goa, May 6, 1812 - Luanda), Goan Catholic, Bachelor of Law of the Faculty of Law, University of Coimbra, Delegate of Regal Attorney in Funchal, Court of Appeal judge of Luanda. His wife (Funchal, Sé, August 13, 1842) was Teresa Cristina de Sá e Bettencourt (Funchal, Sé -?).

Biography 
A physician, Doctor of Medicine, Faculty of Medicine, University of Paris, Minister Plenipotentiary in Paris in 1913 and 1917–1918, senator for the Extremadura Electoral Circle in 1918, Minister of Foreign Affairs of the Governments of Óscar Carmona and José Vicente de Freitas 1926–1928, during the military dictatorship, and President of the Portuguese Delegation to the League of Nations.

On 5 October 1927 he was awarded the Grand Cross of the Military Order of Christ.

An important scientific work left by him was also published.

References

Portuguese people of Goan descent
20th-century Portuguese physicians
19th-century Portuguese writers
20th-century Portuguese writers
Ambassadors of Portugal to France
Foreign ministers of Portugal
19th-century Portuguese physicians
People from São Nicolau, Cape Verde
1854 births
1933 deaths